
Gmina Wręczyca Wielka is a rural gmina (administrative district) in Kłobuck County, Silesian Voivodeship, in southern Poland.

The gmina contains part of the protected area called Upper Liswarta Forests Landscape Park.

Villages
Gmina Wręczyca Wielka contains the villages and settlements of Bieżeń, Bór Zapilski, Borowe, Brzezinki, Czarna Wieś, Długi Kąt, Golce, Grodzisko, Hutka, Jezioro, Kalej, Klepaczka, Kuleje, Nowa Szarlejka, Nowiny, Pierzchno, Piła Druga, Piła Pierwsza, Puszczew, Szarlejka, Truskolasy, Węglowice, Wręczyca Mała, Wręczyca Wielka, Wydra and Zamłynie.

Neighbouring gminas
Gmina Wręczyca Wielka is bordered by the city of Częstochowa and by the gminas of Blachownia, Herby, Kłobuck, Opatów, Panki and Przystajń.

References

Wreczyca Wielka
Kłobuck County